Manuel Aznar Zubigaray (Etxalar, Navarre, Spain, 1893 – Madrid, Spain, 1975) was a diplomat under the Franco regime and one of the most important journalists of the 20th century in Spain.

Biography
He participated in many literary projects with his friend, Manuel Halcón, Marquis of Villar del Tajo. He also was director and one of the founders of the news agency EFE, President of the Madrid Journalist Association, Plenipotentiary Minister in the United States of America, and Spanish ambassador to the UN, Morocco, and some countries in Latin America such as Argentina and the Dominican Republic. Besides his career in diplomacy and journalism, thanks to his close friendship with Juan Lladó y Sánchez-Blanco, he worked in the management of Banco Urquijo (now Banco Sabadell-Urquijo) being an executive of the bank during the presidency of his friend.

He was married to María de las Mercedes Gómez-Acedo y Villanueva (sister of the footballer Domingo Acedo) in Hendaye and had five sons. His grandson José María Aznar served as Prime Minister of Spain between 1996 and 2004.

In 1914, he staged his  theatre play, which is not accessible nowadays, and that his rival Indalecio Prieto described as strongly anti-Spanish.

Aznar Zubigaray joined the Basque Nationalist Party in 1916, later he said before that he never supported the radical thesis that later took over the party. Since 1914, he had worked as a correspondent from World War I frontlines, which earned him the position of editor-in-chief at the central  newspaper. During his time as director, he incorporated many of the most prestigious intellectuals of his time like Fernando de los Ríos, Américo Castro, Ramón Basterra, Ramón J. Sender, Miguel de Unamuno or Azorín. With 22 years he was the director of one of the most important Spanish newspapers of all time and the rumors of him being the better paid journalist of Spain arose.

In 1922, he and his family left for Cuba, where Manuel Aznar Zubigaray worked for several local newspapers. Nonetheless, he still had ties with Latin America, thus being correspondent in Madrid for the Cuban  and the Argentinian . His article:  was awarded the Spanish  for the best article of the year.

During the Republican period, he was part of the establishment and supported conservative politicians such as Miguel Maura, moving later to the centrist Democratic Centre Party of Portela Valladares. With this Centrist Party he tried being elected to the Spanish Parliament but he was unsuccessful. In 1936, with the start of the Spanish Civil War, Aznar Zubigaray left for Burgos and offered his services to the Francoist army and the Falange. Having directed the liberal and regenerationist  caused him problems and at first he was sentenced to death by both sides of the Civil War. Throughout the war, he was an important author of chronicles of the main military events.

Between 1964 and 1967 he was Spain's ambassador to the United Nations. He also served this role in Morocco, Argentina and the Dominican Republic.

He received many Spanish and international awards. Most of its international awards came because of his pro-Allies views during the First World War. The United Kingdom, the Netherlands and France honored him by making him Knight of their Civil Orders. As well as this, Syria named him Knight of its Merit Order. Spain named him Knight of the Order of Charles III, the most important civil decoration in the country, as well as other Civil and Military awards.

Juan Luis Cebrián, director of El País, underlined the importance of Manuel Aznar saying that he promoted the importance of journalism to promote and restore democracy.

He is still a controversial person in Spain with critics such as Gregorio Morán, Basque nationalist Iñaki Anasagasti or his socialist rival Indalecio Prieto and supporters such as the Count of Rodas, the lawyer Antonio Garrigues Díaz-Cabañate, The Arab League or Manuel Fraga that praised him when he died as a great diplomat and journalist.

References

ANASAGASTI, Iñaki ; ERKOREKA, Josu. Dos familias vascas: Areilza-Aznar. Madrid: FOCA, 2003. .

External links
El abuelo del presidente: AZNAR FUE DEL PNV

1890s births
1975 deaths
People from Cinco Villas, Navarre
Basque Nationalist Party politicians
Politicians from Navarre
Spanish people of the Spanish Civil War
Spanish male dramatists and playwrights
20th-century Spanish historians
Permanent Representatives of Spain to the United Nations
Ambassadors of Spain to Argentina
Ambassadors of Spain to Morocco
Ambassadors of Spain to the Dominican Republic
20th-century Spanish dramatists and playwrights
La Vanguardia people
20th-century Spanish journalists